is a railway station in the city of Kurobe, Toyama, Japan, operated by the private railway operator Toyama Chihō Railway.

Lines

Station layout 
The station has two ground-levelopposed  side platforms connected by a level crossing. The station is unattended.

History
Uchiyama Station was opened on 21 November 1923.

Adjacent stations

Surrounding area 
Kurobe River

See also
 List of railway stations in Japan

External links

 

Railway stations in Toyama Prefecture
Railway stations in Japan opened in 1923
Stations of Toyama Chihō Railway
Kurobe, Toyama